Blue Lagoon National Park is a small wildlife haven in the northern part of the Kafue Flats in Zambia's Central Province. It covers about 500 km² and is very accessible, being about 100 km west of Lusaka (120 km by road).

Ecology and wildlife

The Kafue River's main channel is about 10 km south of the southern park boundary.

Herds of Kafue Lechwe are seen in the flooded areas, Sitatunga in the swamps and zebra, Reedbuck and buffalo graze the drier parts. A very large number of bird species can be seen there, especially aquatic birds.

It is similar to Lochinvar National Park in the south of the Kafue Flats (but there is no direct road between the two, except via Lusaka).

Facilities
The land was once a farm and the old farmhouse is now the Park reception.  There are four chalets available for accommodation, and a campsite at the edge of the floodplain.

See also

Wildlife of Zambia

References

National parks of Zambia
Geography of Central Province, Zambia
Tourist attractions in Central Province, Zambia
Kafue River